The Spondolici or Spondolicos were a tribe in Sarmatia Asiatica, that inhabited an area through which the Don river (ancient Tanais) crossed. They were mentioned by Pliny the Elder (23–79).

See also
Spali
Spondophoroi

References

Ancient peoples of Russia
Sarmatian tribes